Fouzia Ejaz Khan is a Pakistani politician who served as member of the National Assembly of Pakistan.

Personal life
Fouzia is daughter of Pakistani politician Kasim Razvi, whose influence and unrealistic vision proved the most detrimental to the interests of Hyderabad State in the crucial years of 1947–48. Her daughter, Atiya Khan is an ex- supermodel and Sufi filmmaker in Pakistan.

Political career
She was elected to the National Assembly of Pakistan as a candidate of Muttahida Qaumi Movement on a seat reserved for women from Sindh in the 2008 Pakistani general election. She resigned from her National Assembly seat in 2012 due to having a dual nationality.

References

Living people
Pakistani MNAs 2008–2013
Muttahida Qaumi Movement MNAs
21st-century Pakistani women politicians
Women members of the National Assembly of Pakistan
Year of birth missing (living people)
Muhajir people